Acidocroton gentryi is a species of plant in the family Euphorbiaceae. It is endemic to Colombia.

References

Codiaeae
Endemic flora of Colombia
Endangered plants
Taxonomy articles created by Polbot